Grant Martin Potulny (born March 4, 1980) is an American former professional ice hockey player. He is currently the head coach of the Northern Michigan Wildcats men's ice hockey team. Potulny was selected by the Ottawa Senators in the 5th round (157th overall) of the 2000 NHL Entry Draft.

Playing career
Potulny played two seasons in the United States Hockey League with the Lincoln Stars, leading his team to win the 1999–2000 Anderson Cup as the team's Most Valuable Player. Potulny then attended the University of Minnesota where he was a three-year captain with the Minnesota Golden Gophers during his college career.

Immediately following his graduation, Potulny turned professional with the Binghamton Senators playing in their final few regular season games and playoff of the 2003–04 AHL season. He also played in the AHL for the Hershey Bears, Springfield Falcons, San Antonio Rampage and Norfolk Admirals. He also played in the Deutsche Eishockey Liga in Germany for Füchse Duisburg. He retired from professional hockey following the 2008–09 AHL season.

Coaching career
In July 2009, Potulny was promoted to full-time assistant coach of the Minnesota Golden Gophers Men's ice hockey team prior to the 2009–10 season.

Prior to the 2013 World Junior Ice Hockey Championships Potulny was named an assistant head coach for Team USA, working alongside Mark Osiecki and Phil Housley. He was again named an assistant coach for Team USA for the 2018 World Junior Ice Hockey Championships.

On April 18, 2017, it was announced that Potulny was selected to be the new head coach at Northern Michigan University. In his first year as head coach, Potulny was named the WCHA Coach of the Year. He had led the Northern Michigan Wildcats to a 19-7-2-2 record. ranking second place in the conference. On March 29, 2018, Potulny signed an eight-year employment agreement with Northern Michigan.

Personal life
He is the older brother of Ryan Potulny, who played in the NHL for the Philadelphia Flyers, Edmonton Oilers, Chicago Blackhawks and Ottawa Senators. He is also a first-cousin to Paul Gaustad.

Head coaching record

Awards and honors

Career statistics

References

External links

1980 births
American men's ice hockey centers
American ice hockey coaches
Binghamton Senators players
Füchse Duisburg players
Hershey Bears players
Ice hockey people from North Dakota
Lincoln Stars players
Living people
Minnesota Golden Gophers men's ice hockey players
Norfolk Admirals players
Ottawa Senators draft picks
San Antonio Rampage players
Sportspeople from Grand Forks, North Dakota
Springfield Falcons players
NCAA men's ice hockey national champions